Ahmad Shedid Ahmed Mahmoud Ahmed Qinawi (born 1 January 1986) is an Egyptian footballer who plays for El-Masry. He is the son of the Egyptian player Shedid Qinawi, El-Masry former player.

Career 
He began playing for the first team on June 14, 2005. He achieved 7 National championships : the shield league and Cup Super Egypt once local and African Champions twice and the African Super once.

His debut in Al Ahly was in a preseason match against Portuguese club Belenenses with coach Manuel José. Ahmad scored a goal, helping Al Ahly achieve a 4–0 win.

Ahmad saw little first team action and he played with the under 20 team until he was fixed in the starting eleven in the 2006–2007 season after the injury of Gilberto and the death of Mohamed Abdelwahab.

On 19 June 2008, El-Masry signed with Al Ahly.

Qinawi returned to Al Ahly for an undisclosed fee in the 2011–2012 season. He made some first performances. This made him a regular starter under head coach Manuel José. He left the club on July 20, 2014.

Later on, he played for Tala'ea El Gaish, Aswan and El Entag El Harby. In October 2020, he rejoined El-Masry.

References

External links
 
 

1986 births
Living people
Egyptian footballers
Al Ahly SC players
Al Masry SC players
Tala'ea El Gaish SC players
Aswan SC players
El Entag El Harby SC players
Association football midfielders
Egyptian Premier League players
Egypt international footballers